Urophora egestata is a species of tephritid or fruit flies in the genus Urophora of the family Tephritidae.

Distribution
Russia, Mongolia, China.

References

Urophora
Insects described in 1953
Diptera of Asia